This is a chronological list of both fictional and non-fictional books written about anarchism. This list includes books that advocate for anarchism as well as those that criticize or oppose it. For ease of access, this list provides a link to the full text whenever possible, as well as the audiobook version as an aid for the visually impaired.

Chronological list

See also 
 Anarchist schools of thought
 History of anarchism
 Labadie Collection

Explanatory footnotes

References

External links 
 Libcom.org: Anarchism—Library of books, articles, and essays about anarchism
 List of books about anarchism at Goodreads
 TheAnarchistLibrary.org: Full list of texts—A list of over 7,000 texts about anarchism
 Anarchy Archives—An online research center on the history and theory of anarchism

Anarchism lists
Anarchism
Anarchist books
Anarchism
Anarchism
Works about anarchism